Fat Kaśka on Tłomackie is the popular name for a neoclassical well originating from the 18th century, located in Warsaw, at the middle of "Solidarności" Avenue close to the intersection with Generała Władysława Andersa Street.

It was built in 1787 and designed by Szymon Bogumił Zug at what was then Tłomackim Square, in the center of the Tłumackie jurydyka. The building has the shape of a cylinder. It is decorated with rusticated panels and has a stepped roof crowned with a gilded ball. The well was one of the few water wells built at that stage in Warsaw.

There was considerable fighting and destruction around it during World War II, notably during the Warsaw Uprising and the destruction of the adjacent Great Synagogue by the Germans in May, 1943. Immediately after the war, from 1947 to 1949, the road around it (then Leszno Street) was widening to create the major cross-street Warsaw W-Z Route. Despite all this, the building remained almost unchanged.

A renovation in 2004 restored its original appearance, including exposing bricked up windows and strengthening its foundations.

Bibliography 
 Encyclopedia of Warsaw. Warsaw: PWN, 1994, pp. 229–230. .

Śródmieście, Warsaw
Infrastructure completed in 1787
1787 establishments in the Polish–Lithuanian Commonwealth